This is a list of unincorporated communities in the U.S. state of Wyoming, listed by county. This may include disincorporated communities, towns with no incorporated status, and ghost towns.

Albany County (Bosler, Buford, Garrett, Tie Siding)
Big Horn County (Emblem, Kane, Otto, Shell)
Campbell County (Recluse, Rozet, Weston)
Carbon County (Arlington, Savery, Walcott)
Converse County (Bill, Orin, Shawnee)
Crook County (Aladdin, Alva, Beulah)
Fremont County (Kinnear, Kotey Place, Lysite, Miner's Delight, St. Stephens, South Pass City)
Goshen County (Jay Em)
Hot Springs County (Gebo)
Johnson County (Linch, Saddlestring)
Laramie County (Carpenter, Granite, Horse Creek, Hillsdale, Meriden)
Lincoln County (Freedom [partly in Idaho], Frontier)
Natrona County (Arminto, Hiland, Natrona)
Park County (Wapiti, Yanceys)
Sheridan County (Banner, Leiter, Wolf, Wyarno)
Sublette County (New Fork)
Sweetwater County (Blairtown, Bryan)
Teton County (Kelly, Moose, Moran)
Uinta County (Bear River City, Millburne, Piedmont)
Weston County (Four Corners)

See also

 List of municipalities in Wyoming
 List of census-designated places in Wyoming

Wyoming geography-related lists
 
Wyoming